The 2014 Rhode Island Rams football team represented the University of Rhode Island in the 2014 NCAA Division I FCS football season. They were led by first year head coach Jim Fleming and played their home games at Meade Stadium. They were a member of the Colonial Athletic Association. They finished the season 1–11, 1–7 in CAA play to finish in 11th place.

Schedule

References

Rhode Island
Rhode Island Rams football seasons
Rhode Island Rams football